John Farson Starr (March 25, 1818, Philadelphia, Pennsylvania – August 9, 1904, Atlantic City, New Jersey), was an American Republican Party politician, who served in the United States House of Representatives, where he represented New Jersey's 1st congressional district for two terms from 1863 to 1867.

Early life and career
Starr was born in Philadelphia on March 25, 1818. He completed preparatory studies, and moved to Camden, New Jersey in 1844. He was one of the founders of the Camden Iron Works and engaged in mercantile pursuits. He was president of the First National Bank of Camden for over thirty years, up to the time of his death.

Congress
Starr was elected as a Republican to the Thirty-eighth and Thirty-ninth Congresses, serving in office from March 4, 1863 – March 3, 1867, but was not a candidate for renomination in 1866. He died in Atlantic City, New Jersey on August 9, 1904, and was interred in Harleigh Cemetery in Camden.

External links

John Farson Starr from The Political Graveyard

1818 births
Politicians from Camden, New Jersey
1904 deaths
Politicians from Philadelphia
Burials at Harleigh Cemetery, Camden
Republican Party members of the United States House of Representatives from New Jersey
19th-century American politicians